The red-necked pond turtle (Mauremys nigricans) is a species of turtles in the family Geoemydidae endemic to China. It is most likely restricted to Guangxi and Guangdong provinces, although pre-historic skull remains have been found in northern Vietnam and Hainan. Other common names include Kwangtung river turtle and black-necked pond turtle.

Anatomy and morphology 
A megacephalic form of the red-necked pond turtle exists, commonly called 'dumb-head'. This form is rarer than the smaller headed individuals. This species has strong sexual dimorphism with a significant size difference between males and females. The largest recorded male's carapace measured 185mm (7.2 in) in length whereas females with a size up to 298 mm (11.7 in) have been found.

References

 Asian Turtle Trade Working Group 2000.  Chinemys nigricans.   2006 IUCN Red List of Threatened Species.   Downloaded on 29 July 2007.

Bibliography

Reptiles of China
Chinemys
Reptiles described in 1834
Taxonomy articles created by Polbot
Endangered Fauna of China